This event was held on Sunday January 27, 2008 as part of the 2008 UCI Cyclo-cross World Championships in Treviso, Italy.

Race summary 

Due to the speedy track, no riders managed to break away from the pack and about 20 riders were still in contention for the title going into the final lap. One of the favourites, Lars Boom, managed to break away at the beginning of the last lap and stayed away, riding to his first World Championship title in the Men's Elite category. Sven Nys, Zdeněk Štybar and Erwin Vervecken came within 4 seconds of closing the gap again, but never succeeded. At the finish line, Štybar outsprinted Nys to take the silver, Vervecken finished fourth. Boom was the first non-Belgian winner since Richard Groenendaal in 2000.

Other favourites Francis Mourey and Bart Wellens crashed heavily in the sixth lap. Mourey abandoned the race, Wellens finished but was unable to recover fully and get back into the leading group.

Ranking 

2 riders, Francis Mourey and Maarten Nijland abandoned the race.

Fastest Laps

Notes

External links
 Union Cycliste Internationale

Men's elite race
UCI Cyclo-cross World Championships – Men's elite race
2008 in cyclo-cross

fr:Championnats du monde de cyclo-cross 2008